Gary Douglas Moore (born February 24, 1945) is an American outfielder in Major League Baseball. Born in Tulsa, Oklahoma, he played in 7 games for the Los Angeles Dodgers in the 1970 baseball season. In that season he recorded 16 at bats, 2 runs, 3 hits, 2 triples, 1 stolen base, and was struck out once. His final batting average was .188.

External links

1945 births
Living people
Major League Baseball outfielders
Los Angeles Dodgers players
Baseball players from Oklahoma
Texas Longhorns baseball players
Sportspeople from Tulsa, Oklahoma
Santa Barbara Dodgers players
Albuquerque Dodgers players
Bakersfield Dodgers players
Arizona Instructional League Dodgers players